Ọláyẹmí, is a Nigerian name meaning "a combination of prestige, success and wealth befits me",. It is from the southwestern region of Nigeria, particularly the Yoruba people. It can be male or female. Notable people with this name include:

 Olayemi Ogunwole, Nigerian radio and television host, known professionally as Honey Pot
 Adeyemi Olayemi (born 1974), Nigerian politician, Chief Whip of the Ondo State House of Assembly, represents All Progressives Congress party
 Taiwo Olayemi Elufioye, Nigerian pharmacologist and researcher, University of Ibadan

See also 

 Ola (given name)

References

Nigerian names
Yoruba given names
Yoruba-language surnames